Colonel Hill Airport , also known as Crooked Island Airport, is an airport in Colonel Hill on Crooked Island in the Bahamas.

Airlines and destinations

References

Airports in the Bahamas